Zygmunt Tadeusz Biesiadecki (26 October 1894 – January 1944) was a Polish actor and director. He was active in theatre and film between 1912 and 1939. A resistance member during the Second World War, he and his wife were arrested by German troops and shot in a street execution in January 1944.

Selected filmography
Gwiaździsta eskadra (1930)
Znachor (1937)

References

External links

1894 births
1944 deaths
Male actors from Kraków
Polish male stage actors
Polish male film actors
20th-century Polish male actors
Polish theatre directors
Polish civilians killed in World War II
Polish resistance members of World War II
Resistance members killed by Nazi Germany
Deaths by firearm in Poland
People executed by Nazi Germany by firing squad
Polish people executed by Nazi Germany